Jack William Miller (born June 25, 2003) also known as Dr. Jack Miller Jr. is an American racing driver. He currently competes in the Indy Pro 2000 Championship for Miller Vinatieri Motorsports.

Personal life 
Miller is a triathlete and fitness enthusiast and can be seen riding his bike around Indianapolis.

Miller is the son of former Indy Racing League driver and dentist Dr. Jack Miller.

Racing record

Career summary 

* Season still in progress.

American open-wheel racing results

U.S. F2000 National Championship 
(key) (Races in bold indicate pole position) (Races in italics indicate fastest lap) (Races with * indicate most race laps led)

Indy Pro 2000 Championship 
(key) (Races in bold indicate pole position) (Races in italics indicate fastest lap) (Races with * indicate most race laps led)

* Season still in progress.

References 

2003 births
Living people
Racing drivers from Indiana
Racing drivers from Indianapolis
U.S. F2000 National Championship drivers
Indy Pro 2000 Championship drivers

United States F4 Championship drivers